SNK vs. Capcom, or alternately Capcom vs. SNK, is a series of crossover video games by either Capcom or SNK featuring characters that appear in games created by either company. Most of these are fighting game, and take on a similar format to Capcom's own Marvel vs. Capcom series, in which the players create teams of fighters and have them fight each other. Games in this series either contain SNK vs. Capcom or Capcom vs. SNK in their titles, with the first company named denoting the company behind the game's development. 

Reception to the series has been varied; the Capcom-developed titles were the most positively-received, while the SNK-developed installments received more mixed reviews.

History

The supposed origin behind this series was an issue of Arcadia magazine in which there were articles covering both The King of Fighters '98 and Street Fighter Alpha 3, both of which were released at around the same time. Readers had misread the cover, which said KOF vs. SF, to mean that there was a fighting game that would pit characters from Street Fighter and The King of Fighters. Because of this uproar, Capcom and SNK supposedly signed a deal that would allow them to produce only two fighting games concerning both franchises in 1999 (the Card Fighters series (see below) were not fighting games and therefore were exempt from the rule). It is highly suggested that SNK vs. Capcom: SVC Chaos was only made in order to fulfill the contract obligations that SNK made prior to the company filing bankruptcy and their eventual closing in 2000. Also, if one company was the main creator of one game, the distributing company would gain the profits and not the company that licensed the characters for use (although SNK gave the rights to use the SNK characters to Capcom for the first Capcom vs. SNK game, SNK did not profit from the game, which did not help their financial problems).

While no new SNK vs. Capcom titles have been released since Card Fighter DS, characters from both companies have appeared together in a handful of other titles, including Akuma and Geese Howard in Bandai Namco's Tekken 7, Mega Man, Ryu, Ken Masters and Terry Bogard in Nintendo's Super Smash Bros. Ultimate, Ryu, Chun-Li, Haohmaru, Genjuro Kibagami and Nakoruru in Cygames' Granblue Fantasy and Ryu, Chun-Li, Akuma, M. Bison and all SNK-created characters featured in SNK vs Capcom series in Netmarble/SNK's The King of Fighters All Star.

Future

In a 2021 interview with Polygon.com, director Hideaki Itsuno confirmed that at one point, there had been plans for a new, 3D installment in the series, but that it had been cancelled due to SNK's bankruptcy. The 3D assets created for Capcom vs. SNK 3 were later repurposed for the cancelled Capcom Fighting All-Stars, said project was set to include The King of Fighters protagonist Kyo Kusanagi as a guest character during its planned release after a deal was struck with the then-reformed SNK Playmore. There were interviews with SNK that it would be possible to renew their contract with Capcom to make new SNK vs. Capcom games, but in another interview, both companies stated that they would not do any further collaboration with each other. SNK vs. Capcom: Card Fighters DS will probably be the last crossover game between both companies. However, in an interview from January 2009, Yoshinori Ono, the producer of Street Fighter IV, expressed interest in a possible third game if fans demand it. 

In August 2022, SNK producer Yasuyuki Oda stated that "both parties" are interested in a potential revival of the series.

SNK-produced games 
 SNK vs. Capcom: The Match of the Millennium - A portable fighting game developed by Dimps and released for the Neo Geo Pocket Color. The game features three different playing rules to choose from (Single Battle, Tag Match, and Team Battle). The game also features an "Olympic Mode" with themed minigames.
 SNK vs. Capcom: Card Fighters Clash - Also released for the Neo Geo Pocket Color, a digital collectible card game featuring trading card based on SNK's and Capcom's properties. Two versions were produced; the SNK Supporter's Version and the Capcom Supporter's Version. 
 SNK vs. Capcom: Card Fighters 2 Expand Edition - The sequel to Card Fighters Clash, released on the Neo Geo Pocket Color in Japan and Asia only. Includes cards based on Capcom vs. SNK 2.
 SNK vs. Capcom: SVC Chaos - Released for the Neo Geo (both arcade and home versions) and ported to the PlayStation 2 and Xbox. A one-on-one fighting game featuring 36 characters.
 SNK vs. Capcom: Card Fighters DS - A Card Fighters Clash sequel released for the Nintendo DS.

Capcom-produced games 
 Capcom vs. SNK: Millennium Fight 2000 - Released for Segas NAOMI arcade hardware in 2000 and ported to the Dreamcast during the same year, the original Capcom vs. SNK features 28 characters (evenly divided between Capcom and SNK properties), two selectable fighting styles or "grooves" (based on the gameplay systems featured in The King of Fighters and Street Fighter Alpha series) and a ratio-based character selection system that determines the number of characters in a player's team based on their strength.
 An updated version titled Capcom vs. SNK Pro, released for the arcades and Dreamcast in Japan and ported to the PlayStation in 2001, which adds Dan Hibiki and Joe Higashi to the character roster (they originally appeared only in the ending sequence of the original game). The Dreamcast version of the game also discards the shop option to earn extra characters and colors, having all of them available by default. 
 Capcom vs. SNK 2: Mark of the Millennium 2001 - Titled Capcom vs. SNK 2: Millionaire Fighting 2001 in Japan. Released for the NAOMI hardware in 2001 and ported to the Dreamcast (in Japan only) and PlayStation 2 during the same year. The game expands on the "Groove" system from the previous game by featuring six different fighting styles or "Grooves" and adds twelve new characters in addition to the ones featured in Capcom vs. SNK Pro.
The Nintendo GameCube and Xbox versions were released under the title of Capcom vs. SNK 2 EO. According to the Japanese official website for the GameCube version, EO stands for Easy Operation, because of a new feature that allows the player to assign special techniques to the right analog stick (C Stick for the GameCube version).

Characters

Reception

The SNK-developed games have been poorly received, with a Metacritic score of 48% for Card Fighters DS and 57% for SVC Chaos. The two Capcom-developed games and SNK vs. Capcom: The Match of the Millennium have fared better, with Capcom vs. SNK 2 Mark of the Millennium 2001 achieving a Metacritic score of 81%.

In 2012, Complex ranked Capcom vs. SNK at number 38 on the list of the best video game franchises.

References

 
Capcom franchises
Capcom games
Neo Geo games
Fighting games
2D fighting games
Nintendo Switch games
SNK franchises
SNK games
SNK Playmore games